Moskorzyn  is a village in the administrative district of Gmina Polkowice, within Polkowice County, Lower Silesian Voivodeship, in south-western Poland.

The name of the village is of Polish origin and comes from the word mucha, which means "fly".

References

Moskorzyn